Radcliffe Tower is the only surviving part of a manor house in Radcliffe, Greater Manchester (historically in Lancashire). It is a Grade I listed building and a Scheduled Monument. The house was rebuilt in 1403 by James de Radcliffe, who was lord of the manor of Radcliffe, and consisted of a stone-built hall and one or two towers, probably built with ashlar blocks. De Radcliffe was given a royal licence to fortify the site including adding crenellations and battlements.

The manor house was demolished in the 19th century leaving only the tower. The remains are owned by Bury council. It was used as a pig sty before being restored.

In 2009, plans to restore the shell of the tower as part of a wider restoration project covering Radcliffe E'es, Close Park and the parish church were launched with the support of Bury Council.

See also

Castles in Greater Manchester
Grade I listed buildings in Greater Manchester
Scheduled Monuments in Greater Manchester
Listed buildings in Radcliffe, Greater Manchester

References

External links

Buildings and structures completed in 1403
Houses completed in the 15th century
Grade I listed buildings in Greater Manchester
Buildings and structures in the Metropolitan Borough of Bury
Scheduled monuments in Greater Manchester
Radcliffe, Greater Manchester
Archaeological sites in Greater Manchester